Verschuur is a Dutch toponymic surname. The name is a contraction of van der schuur, meaning "from the barn". Some variant forms are Verschueren, Verschuren and Verschuuren.  Notable people with the surname include:

Gerrit Verschuur (born 1937), American astronomer
Mike Verschuur (born 1987), Dutch racing driver
Paulus Verschuur (1606–1667), Dutch mayor of Rotterdam portrayed by Frans Hals
Timotheus Josephus Verschuur (1886–1945), Dutch politician
Wouterus Verschuur (1812–1874), Dutch painter

References

Dutch-language surnames
Toponymic surnames